Raymond Edward Orchard (born 9 August 1946) is a former Australian rules footballer who played with Richmond in the Victorian Football League (VFL).

Notes

External links 

Living people
1946 births
Australian rules footballers from Victoria (Australia)
Richmond Football Club players
Dandenong Football Club players